Irving Bacon (born Irving Von Peters; September 6, 1893 – February 5, 1965) was an American character actor who appeared in almost 500 films.

Early years
Bacon was the son of entertainers Millar Bacon and Myrtle Vane. He was born in St. Joseph, Missouri, and grew up in San Diego, California.

Career
Bacon played on the stage for a number of years before getting into films in 1912 in Mack Sennett productions. The actor returned to the Sennett studio in 1924, and appeared frequently in Sennett's silent and sound comedies as a supporting actor. By 1933 Bacon was so well established as a utility player that he was pressed into service to replace Andy Clyde -- wearing Clyde's "old man" costume and makeup -- in a Sennett comedy.

Irving Bacon was sometimes cast in films directed by Lloyd Bacon (incorrectly named as his brother in several sources) such as The Amazing Dr. Clitterhouse (1938). He often played comical "average guys" in scores of feature films; in 1939 alone he appeared in three dozen features. Today's audiences may know him as the soda jerk in the W. C. Fields comedy Never Give a Sucker an Even Break, the wily wagon driver in the Bing Crosby-Fred Astaire musical Holiday Inn, the angry motel guest in the Oscar-winning short Star in the Night, and Glenn Miller's father in The Glenn Miller Story. His most familiar role was as Mr. Beasley, the weary postman in Columbia Pictures' Blondie film series.

During the 1950s, Bacon worked steadily in a number of television sitcoms, most notably I Love Lucy, in which he appeared in two episodes, one of which cast him as Ethel Mertz's father.

Personal life 
Bacon was married to Freda Lee Scoville until her death in 1928, and they had a son and a daughter. In June 1930, Bacon married Margaret Beaver, and they had a son, Frank.; the couple was divorced in 1934. Bacon finally found happiness in 1937, when he wed Bernice Peters. He died on February 5, 1965 in Hollywood.

Filmography

References

External links

 
 
 

1893 births
1965 deaths
Actors from St. Joseph, Missouri
American male film actors
American male silent film actors
American male television actors
Male actors from Missouri
20th-century American male actors
American male stage actors